María Esther Heredia Lecaro de Capovilla, known internationally as María Capovilla (14 September 1889 – 27 August 2006), was an Ecuadorian supercentenarian, and, at the time of her death at age 116 years, 347 days, was recognized by Guinness World Records as the world's oldest living person.

Biography
Born as María Esther Heredia Lecaro in Guayaquil, she was the daughter of a colonel, and lived a life among the upper-class elite, attending social functions and art classes. She never smoked and drank in moderation.

In 1917, she married an Austrian military officer and sailor, Antonio Capovilla (1864–1949). Of Italian ethnicity, Antonio was born in Pola, Austria-Hungary (now Pula, Croatia). He moved to Chile in 1894 and then to Ecuador in 1910. After his first wife died, he married María until his death in 1949. Together they had five children, three of whom were still living at the time of María's death: Hilda (age 81), Irma (age 79) and son Anibal (age 77). She also had twelve grandchildren, twenty great-grandchildren and two great-great-grandchildren.

At age 100, Capovilla nearly died and was given last rites, but had been free of health problems since then. In December 2005, at the age of 116, Maria was in good health for someone of her age and watched TV, read the paper and walked without the aid of a stick (though she was helped by an aide). Capovilla was unable to leave her home in the two years before her death and she shared her home with her eldest daughter Hilda, and her son-in-law. In a media interview Capovilla stated her dislike of the fact that women nowadays are permitted to court men, rather than the reverse.

In March 2006, however, Capovilla's health had declined, and she was not able to read the newspaper any more. She had nearly stopped talking and no longer walked except when helped by two people. Still, Capovilla was able to sit in her chair and fan herself, and had been doing fine until she succumbed to a bout of pneumonia in the last week of August 2006, 18 days before she would have celebrated her 117th birthday.

Age records

At the time of her death at age 116 years, 347 days, Capovilla was the fourth-oldest verified person to have ever lived. Capovilla had been the oldest verified South American until  from Brazil surpassed her age on 4 October 2021 and died the next day. María Capovilla was also the last living person verified to have been born in the 1880s.

Following her death on 27 August 2006, her successor as oldest person was Elizabeth Bolden. Bolden became only the second person to be considered the world's oldest person on two occasions (Frenchwoman and all-time world recordholder Jeanne Calment was the first).

See also
List of the verified oldest people
List of the oldest people by country

References

External links
 The word from the world's oldest person (with photo)
 World's Oldest Woman dies at 116
 Ecuadoran woman who once drank donkey milk is now world's oldest (with family photo)
 Ecuadorean woman, 116, is world's oldest (story notes Mrs Capovilla walks with assistance, not unaided)

1889 births
2006 deaths
Deaths from pneumonia in Ecuador
Ecuadorian centenarians
People from Guayaquil
Women supercentenarians